Kawasaki Igo-1-B, otherwise known as Kawasaki Ki-148 was a World War II Japanese guided air-to-surface missile designed in 1944. Developed along its sister projects of Kawasaki Igo-1-A and Tokyo Imperial University designed Igo-1-C, the Igo-1-B was a simple radio-controlled guided bomb propelled by a rocket engine generating  of thrust for up to 80 seconds.

Test trials were carried out in late 1944 and the weapon was quickly ordered by the war ministry. Launched during tests from a modified Kawasaki Ki-48 light bomber, its standard mother aircraft was to be the modern Kawasaki Ki-102 heavy fighter. Although approximately 180 missiles were built, none saw service before the end of World War II.

References

Bibliography

 

Kawasaki aircraft
Air-to-surface missiles
World War II weapons of Japan
World War II guided missiles